Essex (formerly known as Essex—Windsor) is a federal electoral district in Ontario, Canada, represented in the House of Commons of Canada from 1867 to 1882 and since 1968.

Geography
The riding includes the Municipalities of LaSalle, Amherstburg, Essex, Kingsville, and the western/central portion of Lakeshore.
See Elections Canada map.

History

Essex was created in the British North America Act of 1867. It consisted of Essex County. It was abolished in 1882 when it was redistributed into Essex North and Essex South ridings.

Essex was re-created in 1966 from Essex East, Essex South and Essex West. The new riding consisted initially of the Town of Essex, the Townships of Anderdon, Colchester North, Colchester South, Malden, Rochester, Sandwich South, Tilbury North and Tilbury West, and the southern parts of the Township of Sandwich West and the City of Windsor, and the southeastern part of the Township of Maidstone. The name of the electoral district was changed in 1972 to "Essex—Windsor".

In 1976, the riding was re-defined to consist of the Townships of Anderdon, Colchester North, Maidstone, Malden, Rochester, Sandwich South, Sandwich West, Tilbury North and Tilbury West, including the Town of Essex, but excluding the Town of Tecumseh and the Village of St. Clair Beach, and the southeast part of the City of Windsor.

In 1987, the riding was re-defined to consist of the southeastern part of the City of Windsor, the towns of Amherstburg, Belle River and Essex, and the townships of Anderdon, Maidstone, Malden, Rochester, Sandwich South, Sandwich West, Tilbury North and Tilbury West.

Essex—Windsor was abolished in 1996 when it was re-distributed between a new "Essex" riding and Windsor West. The new Essex riding was created from parts of Essex—Windsor and Essex—Kent ridings.

It consisted initially of Pelee Island and the County of Essex excluding the City of Windsor, the towns of Leamington and Tecumseh, the Village of St. Clair Beach and the Township of Mersea. In 2003, it was redefined to consist of the County of Essex excluding the City of Windsor and the towns of Leamington and Tecumseh.

This riding lost territory to Chatham-Kent—Leamington during the 2012 electoral redistribution. Namely, Pelee Island and the eastern portion of the Town of Lakeshore.

Members of Parliament

This riding has elected the following Members of Parliament:

Demographics 
According to the 2021 Canada Census

Ethnic groups: 85.5% White, 4.1% Indigenous, 2.9% South Asian, 2.0% Arab, 1.4% Black, 1.2% Chinese

Languages: 82.5% English, 2.4% French, 1.8% Italian, 1.2% Arabic, 1.1% German

Religions: 68.6% Christian (42.7% Catholic, 4.2% Anglican, 3.9% United Church, 1.8% Christian Orthodox, 1.6% Baptist, 1.3% Pentecostal, 1.0% Presbyterian, 1.0% Lutheran, 11.1% Other), 2.5% Muslim, 1.0% Sikh, 26.6% None

Median income: $46,400 (2020)

Average income: $59,700 (2020)

Election results

Essex 1996–present

Essex—Windsor 1970–1996

Essex 1966–1970

Essex 1867–1882

See also
 List of Canadian federal electoral districts
 Past Canadian electoral districts

References

Notes

External links
Federal riding history from the Library of Parliament:
Essex 1867-1882
Essex 1966-1972
Essex-Kent 1972-1996
Essex 1996-present
 Campaign expense data from Elections Canada

Ontario federal electoral districts
Essex, Ontario